Krynickillus is a genus of gastropods belonging to the family Agriolimacidae.

The species of this genus are found in Europe.

Species:

Krynickillus cyrniacus 
Krynickillus dymczeviczii 
Krynickillus eichwaldii 
Krynickillus hoplites 
Krynickillus melanocephalus 
Krynickillus urbanskii

References

Agriolimacidae